J.J. Johnston (born James William Johnston, October 24, 1933 – November 4, 2022) was an American theatre and film actor, boxing historian and writer.

Johnston served eighteen months in prison for drug-related offenses before turning to acting.

Johnston died on November 4, 2022, at the age of 89.

Books
Johnston, a former amateur boxer, was the author of several books on the history of boxing.
Babyface and Pop, with Nick Beck (2011)
Chicago Boxing (Images of Sports), with Sean Curtin and David Mamet (2005) 
Chicago Amateur Boxing (Images of Sports), with Sean Curtin (2006)

Stage work
Johnston performed in the original 1975 production of David Mamet's American Buffalo in Chicago and subsequently performed in the 1983 Broadway production opposite Al Pacino.

Filmography

Awards
1983-84 New York Theatre World Award for Outstanding New Talent in "American Buffalo"
1986 Bay Area Critics Award for Outstanding Supporting Performance by an Actor in the play Glengarry Glen Ross.

References

External links

1933 births
2022 deaths
American male film actors
American male stage actors
American people convicted of drug offenses
Male actors from Chicago